Slovak cuisine varies slightly from region to region across Slovakia. It was influenced by the traditional cuisine of its neighbours and it influenced them as well. The origins of traditional Slovak cuisine can be traced to times when the majority of the population lived self-sufficiently in villages, with very limited food imports and exports and with no modern means of food preservation or processing.

This gave rise to a cuisine heavily dependent on a number of staple foods that could stand the hot summers and cold winters. These included wheat, potatoes, milk and milk products, pork meat, sauerkraut and onion. To a lesser degree beef, poultry, lamb and goat, eggs, a few other local vegetables, fruit and wild mushrooms were traditionally eaten.

All these were usually produced and processed by families themselves with some local trade at the country markets. Wheat was ground, and bread, dumplings and noodles were made from it. Potatoes were mostly boiled or processed into potato dough. Milk was processed into a wide range of products such as butter, cream, sour cream, buttermilk, and various types of cheese etc.

Typical pork products include sausages, smoked bacon, and lard. Spices were not widely used, and animal fats and butter were used instead of cooking oils. Main beverages included fresh and sour milk, and beer. Contemporary Slovak cuisine is widely influenced by various world cuisines and uses many different ingredients, spices and industrially processed foods.

Slovak dishes
 
 : potato dumplings with bryndza, a sheep's-milk cheese
 
 : (pancakes made of potato dough baked directly on the stove)
 
 : tagliatelle with quark (farmer's cheese) and fried bacon
 : a dish consisting of pork stew with sauerkraut and cream or sour cream, usually served with steamed dumplings
 : schnitzel, usually breaded

Soups and sauces
  (soup made of beans, usually with pork meat and/or sausages)
  (soup made of sauerkraut), often also mushrooms, meat and sausage, and sometimes served in a bread bowl
  (chicken soup with noodles)
  (bryndza-based soup)
 Tripe soup
 , traditional goulash soup
 , simple goulash soup made of different vegetables, potato and meat (usually beef) cooked together for hours
 Venison goulash, traditionally from deer, often served in a bread cup
 Garlic soup

Meat
Pork, beef and poultry are the main meats consumed in Slovakia, with pork being the most popular by a substantial margin. Among poultry, chicken is most common, although duck, goose, and turkey are also well established. Game meats, especially boar, rabbit, and venison, are also widely available throughout the year. Lamb and goat are also available, but for the most part are not very popular. The consumption of horse meat is generally frowned upon.

Grilled meat is not common in Slovakia. Instead, meat is either breaded and fried in oil (schnitzel), or cooked and served in sauce. Hungarian influences in Slovak cuisine can be seen in popular stews and goulashes. However, these have been given Slovak touches. Chicken paprikash is typically served with halušky and Hungarian goulash (spicy beef stew) is served with slices of a large bread-like steamed dumpling.

Traditional sweets and cookies

Usually baked at Christmas time, but also all year long, Slovak traditional sweets are usually home baked and harder to find in stores.
 
  (steamed dumplings with various  fillings (jam, plum, curd, poppy) topped with poppy seeds, sugar, butter, sour cream, breadcrumbs or nuts, similar to Austrian Germknödel, and Chinese Baozi buns)
  (coconut meringue cookies with walnuts and creamy filling)
  (bread pudding)
  (two layers of cookie-like round tarts "glued" with marmalade and poured with powdered sugar)
  (rice pudding)
  (sweet walnut roll)
  (poppy seed roll)
  (rolls of leavened dough filled with ground poppy seed or walnut, filling determines the shape)
  (two layers of cookie-like round tarts filled with chocolate cream and half-dipped in dark chocolate)
  (honey based cookies, similar to gingerbread)
  (ginger flavoured biscuits)
  ("bear paws" - walnut/cocoa based cookies)

Main daily meal
Traditionally the main meal of the day is lunch, eaten around noon. However, changing work routine has altered this in the recent decades; today, many Slovaks have their main meal in the evening. Lunch in Slovakia usually consists of soup and a main course. It is customary in Slovakia to bring a bottle of wine or other alcohol as a gift if one is invited to visit someone's home.

Books on Slovak cuisine
 Ján Babilon: , 1870
 Vojtech Španko . Osveta, Martin, 1977, 4.vydanie 1982
 František Kotrba: , Dona, 
 Anna Demrovská: , Knižné centrum, 2007, 
 Ľudmila Dullová: , Ikar, 2007, 
 Jana Horecká: , 2007, 
 Daša Racková: , Ikar, 2007, 
 Zora Mintalová - Zubercová: , Vydavateľstvo Matice slovenskej, 2009, 
 Zora Mintalová - Zubercová: , Vydavateľstvo Matice slovenskej, 2010,

See also

Czech cuisine
Polish cuisine

External links
 Illustrated Slovak recipes